Anna Trener-Wierciak (born 31 March 1991) is a Polish Paralympic athlete with multiple sclerosis. She represented Poland at the 2016 Summer Paralympics in Rio de Janeiro, Brazil and she won the bronze medal in the women's long jump T38 event. She also competed in the women's 100 metres T38 where she did not qualify to compete in the final.

Career 

At the 2017 World Para Athletics Championships held in London, United Kingdom, she won the bronze medal in the women's long jump T38 event.

In 2017, at the World Para Athletics Grand Prix in Tunis, Tunisia, she won the gold medal in the women's women’s long jump T12/20/37/38 event and in the women's 100 metres T36/37/38 event.

At the 2018 World Para Athletics European Championships held in Berlin, Germany, she won the bronze medal in the women's long jump T38 event.

Achievements

References

External links 
 

Living people
1991 births
Place of birth missing (living people)
Athletes (track and field) at the 2016 Summer Paralympics
Athletes (track and field) at the 2020 Summer Paralympics
Medalists at the 2016 Summer Paralympics
Paralympic bronze medalists for Poland
Polish female long jumpers
Paralympic athletes of Poland
People with multiple sclerosis
Paralympic medalists in athletics (track and field)
Medalists at the World Para Athletics European Championships
Medalists at the World Para Athletics Championships